Igbo Eze North is a Local Government Area in the north of  Enugu State, Nigeria. It borders Kogi State and Benue State. Its headquarters are in the town of Enugu-Ezike. Igbo Eze North is made up of two towns. They are Enugu Ezike and Etteh. Igbo is the major and commonly used language.
 
It has an area of 293 km and a population of 259,431 at the 2006 census.

The postal code of the area is 413.

The Igbo language is the most widely used language in Igbo Eze North local government area. However, Idoma and Igala languages are common amongst migrants.

Government of Igbo Eze North 
The Igbo Eze North local government council is in charge of public administration in Igbo Eze north local government area. The council is headed by a chairman who is also the head of the executive arm of the local government. The current chairman of Igbo Eze north local government area is Hon. Engr. William Ejike Itodo. Before being elected the Chairman of the Igbo Eze North. Comrade Uwakwe Ezeja served as the Caretaker Committee Chairman of the local government.

There are twenty (20) council wards in  Igbo Eze North Local Government. The twenty council wards  include Essodo 1, Essodo 11, Essodo 111, Ette 1, Ette 11, Ette central, Ezzodo, Umuitodo I, Umuitodo II, Umuitodo III, Umuozzi I, Umuozzi II, Umuozzi III, Umuozzi IV, Umuozzi IX, Umuozzi V, Umuozzi VI, Umuozzi VII, Umuozzi VIII and  Umuozzi X.

Each council ward is represented by a local government elected councilor. The twenty (20) councilors form the legislative arm of the local government.

References

Local Government Areas in Enugu State
Local Government Areas in Igboland